Bembidion properans is a species of ground beetle in the family Carabidae. It is found in North America, Europe, Africa, and temperate Asia.

References

Further reading

External links

 

properans
Articles created by Qbugbot
Beetles described in 1828